Antoine Sfeir  (25 November 1948 – 1 October 2018) was a Franco-Lebanese journalist.

Biography
Sfeir was the editor of the French journal Les Cahiers de l'Orient (Notebooks from the East), a quarterly publication devoted to the Arab and Muslim world, and the president of the CERPO (Study and Research Center on the Middle East). A former professor of international relations at the CELSA (Paris-Sorbonne University) school, he was also president of the ILERI international relations school (Institut Libre d'Etude des Relations Internationales).

On June 13, 1976, he was kidnapped by pro-Syrian militiamen from the Popular Front for the Liberation of Palestine. He was held captive for seven days, during which he was tortured (bayonet in the back, blows with the butt on the fingers and in the jaw, torn nails). This episode pushed him to leave Lebanon to take refuge in France, where he arrived on September 3, 1976. His knowledge of Arab countries and the Muslim world means that he quickly becomes an expert solicited by French media to decipher current events in the Middle East.

A recognized expert on Islam, Sfeir warned against the dangers of radicalism as soon as in the 2000s : "...foreign imams often found an all too willing audience in France's rundown immigrant suburbs. The kids there already watch Arab stations on satellite TV, with their bloodthirsty slogans and anti-western propaganda. They've already been totally radicalized."

Sfeir wrote numerous books about Islam and the Middle East; one of which was The Columbia World Dictionary of Islamism, translated by John King (Columbia University Press). He was often interviewed about international affairs on television talkshows, newspapers, and Administration commissions.

In his book Tunisie, terre de paradoxes published in 2006, he was accused of supporting the regime of Ben Ali in particular by denying its police and authoritarian character. Sfeir replied that he always considered "the Tunisian people as an example for the whole region" in terms of education, modernization and regional integration, as well as in the fight against religious fundamentalism". But in February 2011, Sfeir admitted that he was "heavily mistaken" on Tunisia and the Ben Ali regime.

Sfeir was made an Officer of the Legion of Honour in 2009. He died on 1 October 2018.

References 

1948 births
2018 deaths
University of Paris alumni
Lebanese journalists
20th-century French journalists
21st-century French journalists
Lebanese emigrants to France
Writers from Beirut
Officers of the Ordre national du Mérite
Officiers of the Légion d'honneur
French male non-fiction writers
French scholars of Islam
Deaths from cancer in France